James Wigley (10 August 1700–21 June 1765) was a British politician.

Born on 10 August 1700, James was the second surviving son of Sir Edward Wigley of Scraptoft Hall and his wife Laetitia Cressey. He was educated at Rugby School, and then Magdalen College, Oxford, matriculating on 20 March 1718 at the age of 17. In 1718, he married Martha, the daughter and heir of Richard Ebourne of Allesley, Warwickshire.

By this time, Wigley had inherited Scraptoft Hall following the death of his father in 1711, and his older brother in 1716. The hall was enlarged and completely remodelled by his mother, Lady Wigley, in 1723, whilst James laid out grounds including a lake, a pond, and a mound concealing a small shell-lined grotto topped by a Chinese-style pavilion.

Wigley was first elected  member of parliament for Leicester in a by-election on 27 April 1737, and served for the next 28 years. He voted consistently against the governments of George II, Lord Egmont describing him as "much such another man as Smith," i.e. "a good natured Tory who does not love attendance."

References

 

1700 births
1765 deaths
People educated at Rugby School
Alumni of Magdalen College, Oxford
Members of the Parliament of Great Britain for English constituencies
British MPs 1734–1741
British MPs 1741–1747
British MPs 1747–1754
British MPs 1754–1761
British MPs 1761–1768
Tory MPs (pre-1834)